Sherman Way station is a station on the G Line of the Los Angeles Metro Busway system located at Sherman Way in downtown Canoga Park — a community of Los Angeles in the western San Fernando Valley. The station is in service on the Metro G Line Chatsworth Extension. It opened in June 2012.

Sherman Way station is located on the intersection of Canoga Avenue and Sherman Way. The station features similar station amenities as the existing Orange Line stations. Station art is added to the station.

It has a parking lot with 207 spaces along with bicycle lockers.

History 

Southern Pacific built their Canoga Park station along the Burbank branch in 1912. The station building was on the north side of Sherman Way. The same year, the Pacific Electric Owensmouth Line was completed to Owensmouth, crossing the tracks at Sherman Way. Southern Pacific ceased passenger service on the line in 1920, and Pacific Electric stopped running cars here after 1938. The old station building was designated a Los Angeles Historic-Cultural Monument in May 1990, three years before the structure was destroyed in a fire.

The Orange Line was constructed over the former Burbank branch, with bus rapid transit service starting at the newly built station on June 30, 2012.

Sherman Way is named after General Moses Sherman, due to his land development and rail lines he built in the valley.

Service

Station layout

Hours and frequency

Connections 
, the following connections are available:
 Los Angeles Metro Bus:

Nearby destinations 
The station is within walking distance of the following notable places:
 Downtown Canoga Park shops, antiques row
 Madrid Theater

References

External links 

Los Angeles Metro Busway stations
Canoga Park, Los Angeles
G Line (Los Angeles Metro)
Public transportation in the San Fernando Valley
Public transportation in Los Angeles
Bus stations in Los Angeles
2012 establishments in California